A racial hoax occurs when a person (usually the purported victim) falsely claims that a crime was committed by member of a specific race.  The crime may be fictitious, or may be an actual crime.

The term was popularised by Katheryn Russell-Brown in her book The Color of Crime: Racial Hoaxes, White Fear, Black Protectionism, Police Harassment and Other Macroaggressions (1998). A racial hoax can be performed by a person of any race, against a person of any race. According to Russell-Brown, racial hoaxes where whites falsely accuse African Americans are most likely to receive media attention and create a more acute social problem due to the criminal black man stereotype.

Concept
Patricia L. Brougham argued that the common stereotype of criminal black men has enabled the use of racial hoaxes against this group. Brougham writes that these stereotypes cause law enforcement agencies to believe that a black perpetrator exists when in reality the allegation is false.

Russell-Brown argues that racial hoaxes are devised, perpetrated, and successful because they take advantage of fears and stereotypes. According to her, white-on-black hoaxes are the most likely to receive media attention and to cause social and economic problems. She argues that anyone performing a racial hoax should face criminal charges, particularly if a black person is targeted, and that hoaxes targeting black people create more severe problems than those against other racial groups. Letha A. See in Violence as Seen Through a Prism of Color (2001) sees the hoax as a unique method used against specific racial groups, rather than against individuals. Sally S. Simpson and Robert Agnew suggest that the unusual nature of some racial hoaxes can cause them to be dismissed.

Between 1987 and 1996 in the United States, Russell-Brown documented 67 racial hoax cases, and notes the following: 70 percent were white-on-black hoaxes; more than half were exposed within a week; hoaxes are most frequently used to allege assault, rape, or murder; hoax perpetrators were charged with filing a false report in about 45 percent of cases. These cases represent only a fraction of the total number of cases because racial hoaxes are not reported as such and most crimes are not covered in the media. According to Russell-Brown, a high proportion of the white-on-black hoaxes were perpetrated by police and judicial officers; she documents seven such cases. Historically the most common type of hoax perpe  against black males was rape. Because of fears over the 'black rapist', Russell-Brown suggests "it is not surprising that so many White women have created Black male rapists as their fictional criminals".

An alternative type of hoax occurs when a member of a disadvantaged group pretends to be a victim of a hate crime often in order to inflame societal racial tensions, gain social capital through legitimizing grievance and gaining victim status or to distract attention from their own misconduct in another activity.

In the United States there has been little legislative response to racial hoaxes. Russel-Brown wrote that (at the time of the book written) only New Jersey considered new laws to criminalize racial hoaxes.

Cases

Scottsboro Boys

In 1931, two white women falsely accused nine African-American teenagers of raping them on a train in Alabama. All but one were convicted and sentenced to death by all-white juries.

Emmett Till

Emmett Till was a 14-year-old African-American who was accused of "offending" a white woman in Money, Mississippi, in 1955. He was abducted and lynched several days later. In 2017, author Timothy Tyson released details of a 2008 interview with Carolyn Bryant. He claimed that during the interview she had disclosed that she had fabricated parts of her testimony at the trial of his accused killers. Tyson said that during the interview, Bryant retracted her testimony that Till had grabbed her around her waist and uttered obscenities, saying "that part's not true". However, the 'recanting' claim made by Tyson was not on his tape-recording of the interview. "It is true that that part is not on tape because I was setting up the tape recorder" Tyson said. Donham's daughter-in-law, Marsha Bryant, who was present for the two interviews, said her mother-in-law "never recanted." The support Tyson provided to back up his claim was a handwritten note that he said had been made at the time.

Tawana Brawley

Tawana Brawley, an African-American teenager, was found in a trash bag covered in faeces after being missing from her home in Wappingers Falls, New York for four days. She claimed that she had been abducted and raped by four white men, and her legal team subsequently claimed that the authorities were protecting the assailants because they were white, sparking a debate about systemic racism in New York. A grand jury later concluded that Brawley had fabricated her story and had deliberately set things up to make it look like she had been assaulted. Brawley's legal team - Al Sharpton, Alton Maddox and Vernon Mason - were accused of having exploited the story to trigger racial outrage and advance their careers, and one of the men accused successfully sued Brawley, Sharpton, Maddox and Mason for defamation.

Charles Stuart

The case of Charles Stuart is often cited as an example of a racial hoax. On October 23, 1989, in Boston, Stuart and his pregnant wife Carol were driving when, according to Stuart, a black gunman forced his way into the car and shot them both, hitting Carol in the head and Stuart in the body. Still alive, Stuart drove away and called the police, who conducted a search of Mission Hill, Boston, a mostly black area. Carol died later that night; the baby, delivered by caesarean section, died 17 days later.

Stuart picked out Willie Bennett, a black man, from a photo lineup. The police shifted their attention onto Stuart when Stuart's brother Matthew told them that Stuart had committed the murder, and when they noted inconsistencies in Stuart's account. On January 4, 1990, Stuart committed suicide. The police later learned that Stuart had committed the murder to cash in on his wife's insurance policy.

Jesse Anderson

In 1992, Jesse Anderson became infamous for stabbing his wife Barbara E. Anderson thirty-seven times while in the parking lot of a T.G.I. Friday's in Milwaukee. Anderson blamed two African-American men for attacking him and his wife, and even presented police with a Los Angeles Clippers basketball cap he claimed to have knocked off the head of one of the assailants.

When details of the crime were made public, a university student told police Anderson had purchased the hat from him a few days earlier. According to employees at a military surplus store, the red-handled fishing knife which was used to murder Barbara was sold to Anderson only a few weeks earlier. Police stated that the store was the only one in Milwaukee that sold that type of knife. Anderson was shortly thereafter charged with murder, found guilty, and sentenced to life imprisonment.

Susan Smith

In October 1994, in South Carolina, Susan Smith drowned her sons by putting them in her car and letting it roll into John D. Long Lake. She called the police and stated that an armed black man had hijacked her car with her two sons inside. After an extensive manhunt, Smith confessed that she had killed her sons, and, in July 1995, was sentenced to life imprisonment.

Sef Gonzales

In 2001, after killing his family, Sef Gonzales disposed of the murder weapons and the clothing and the size 7 running shoes he was wearing at the time of the murders. He showered, changed clothes, and spray painted the words "Fuck off Asians" on a wall in the house in an attempt to fool investigating police into believing that his family had been the victims of a hate crime. News stories in Australia and the Philippines at the time reported police were still establishing a motive for the killings and focused mostly on slain Teddy Gonzales's past business dealings.

Jennifer Wilbanks 

Jennifer Wilbanks was a white woman who ran away from home on April 26, 2005, in order to avoid her upcoming wedding with John Mason, her fiancé.  Her disappearance from Duluth, Georgia, sparked a nationwide search and intensive media coverage, including media speculation that Mason had killed her. On April 29, Wilbanks called Mason from Albuquerque, New Mexico, and falsely claimed that she had been kidnapped and sexually assaulted by a Hispanic man and a white woman. Wilbanks told investigators that she was abducted while running, and tied-up with rope in the back of a van, and was raped by a Hispanic man and forced to perform sexual acts with a white woman.  Wilbanks pled no contest to a felony charge of providing false information to law enforcement, and served no time in jail.

Duke lacrosse case

The Duke lacrosse case was a criminal investigation into a 2006 false accusation of rape made against three members of the men's lacrosse team at Duke University in Durham, North Carolina by  Crystal Mangum, an African American student at North Carolina Central University who worked as a stripper, dancer and escort.

Many people involved in, or commenting on the case, including Durham prosecutor Mike Nifong (who was later disbarred), called or suggested that the alleged assault was a hate crime.

Ashley Todd mugging hoax

In October 2008, Ashley Todd, a volunteer for the U.S. presidential campaign of Republican John McCain, falsely claimed to have been the victim of robbery and politically motivated physical assault by a supporter of McCain's Democratic opponent Barack Obama.

The story broke less than two weeks before the 2008 United States presidential election on November 4. Todd later confessed to inventing the story after surveillance photos and a polygraph test were presented.  She was charged with filing a false police report, and entered a probation program for first-time offenders.

State University of New York at Albany bus attack hoax
In January 2016, two black and one Hispanic female University at Albany (SUNY) students (Alexis Briggs, Asha Burwell and Ariel Agudio) gained national attention when they accused 10 to 12 white men and women of harassment and assault and that "racial slurs were used by the perpetrators" while riding a public CDTA bus. Hillary Clinton tweeted her support for them, asserting "There's no excuse for racism and violence on a college campus."

The three were eventually indicted by a grand jury and arraigned for "10 misdemeanor charges, including assault, attempted assault and false reporting, along with a violation for harassment." Furthermore, the university expelled Agudio and Burwell and suspended Briggs for two years.

Agudio and Burwell faced up to two years in jail for false reporting conviction but were sentenced to three years' probation, 200 hours of community service and a $1,000 fine when they were found guilty of two charges out of the original eleven. Briggs accepted a plea deal from the district attorney's office of community service in exchange for a public apology.

Officer Sherry Hall shooting hoax 
In September 2016, Georgia police officer Sherry Hall claimed "a 6-foot, 230-pound African American man" had shot her, and that only her protective vest saved her life. The Georgia Bureau of Investigation determined that she fabricated the whole incident and charged her with four felonies, including evidence tampering and giving false statements to investigators.  Hall was convicted of 11 criminal charges, including "making false statements, violating her oath and tampering with evidence," and sentenced to 15 years in prison and 23 years on probation.

Maria Daly BLM burglary hoax 
In October 2016, Maria Daly, the wife of a police officer, reported a burglary at her family home. She stated that jewelry and money had been stolen, and that her house was tagged with graffiti referencing the Black Lives Matter movement. Police determined that the entire account was false, and charged Daly with filing a false police report and misleading a police investigation. Daly eventually pleaded guilty, essentially confirming that she had staged the burglary and spray-painted the house herself.

Jason Stokes BLM arson 
In August 2016, former firefighter Jason Stokes claimed that the Black Lives Matter movement had set fire to his home and written "lie with pigs, fry like bacon" on the wall in retaliation for his "Blue Lives Matter" banner. Police charged Stokes with arson, concluding that he had set the fire himself and written the offending message to cover up the crime, and had also booby-trapped the house to hinder investigation. A jury acquitted Stokes on May 15, 2017, agreeing that it was arson but not finding "enough evidence to convict Stokes."

Sherri Papini disappearance hoax

Sherri Papini disappeared from her husband and family on November 2, 2016, reportedly while out jogging a mile from her home in Redding, California. Papini was 34 years old at the time.  She reappeared three weeks later on Thanksgiving Day, November 24, claiming that she was freed by her captors at 4:30 that morning still wearing restraints.   According to Shasta County Sheriff Tom Bosenko, in interviews Papini said she was held by two Hispanic women who took steps to keep their faces hidden from her, either by wearing masks or by keeping Papini's head covered. On March 3, 2022, Sherri Papini was arrested by the FBI, accused of lying to federal agents and faking her kidnapping to spend time with her ex-boyfriend away from her husband and family.

Yasmin Seweid Trump fans subway harassment
During December 2016, 18-year-old Yasmin Seweid claimed that a group of white men approached her on a New York City subway and stated "Donald Trump! Donald Trump! Fucking terrorist, get out of this country, you don't belong here, terrorist, get out of this country." She also claimed one of the men grabbed her bag and broke the strap. Seweid later admitted that she lied about the incident because she did not want her strict father to find out that she was out past her curfew drinking alcohol. Seweid was arrested and plead guilty to falsely reporting an incident and disorderly conduct.

Walker Daugherty illegal immigrant shooting hoax 
In January 2017, hunting guide Walker Daugherty and his client Edwin Roberts were both shot near the Texas-Mexico border. Daugherty and his fellow guide, Michael Bryant, told authorities that they were attacked by immigrants who had entered the country illegally and tried to steal an RV. All the bullet casings and projectiles found on the scene, however, matched guns belonging to the hunting party. Investigation determined that Daugherty shot Roberts and Bryant shot Daugherty. A grand jury indicted Bryant and Daugherty on charges of "using deadly conduct by discharging firearms in the direction of others," a felony. Roberts and his wife subsequently filed a personal injury lawsuit against Bryant, Daugherty, and their business seeking $1 million in damages for negligence.

Concord Fortress of Hope arson attack 
In October 2017, the predominantly black Concord Fortress of Hope church in Kansas City was set on fire, with racist graffiti referencing the Ku Klux Klan found at the scene. However, a black church employee named Nathaniel Nelson eventually admitted to starting the fire to cover up his theft of money from the church's cultural center, before writing the graffiti to throw suspicion onto white supremacists. Nelson pleaded guilty to arson in 2018.

Breana Harmon abduction hoax
In 2017, 19 year-old white woman Breana Harmon from Denison, Texas, falsely claimed she was abducted and gang-raped by three black men. She initially was in an argument with her boyfriend, then ran away and intentionally cut herself to give the appearance of an assault.  She then stripped-down to a T-shirt and underwear, and went into a church and told the people there that she had been raped by three masked black men.  She later pled guilty to charges of filing a false police report.

Sherita Dixon-Cole Rape hoax
In May 2018 Sherita Dixon-Cole, a black human resources professional falsely accused a white Texas state trooper of kidnapping and sexually assaulting her during a DUI arrest.

Jussie Smollett hate crime hoax

In 2019, Jussie Smollett, an American actor and singer on the Fox drama series Empire, made national news for fabricating a racially-motivated attack. On January, 22, a letter arrived at the Chicago studio of Smollett's employer that was addressed to Smollett and depicted a stick figure hanging from a tree with a gun pointing towards it. It read "Smollett, Jussie you will die" and "MAGA" and contained a white powder determined to be Tylenol. On January 29, 2019, Smollett told police that he was attacked in the early morning of that day in the 300 block of East Lower North Water Street in Chicago's Streeterville neighborhood by two men in ski masks who called him racial and homophobic slurs in what was initially investigated as a hate crime. Smollett was indicted on February 20, 2019, for disorderly conduct consisting of paying two Nigerian-American brothers to stage a fake hate crime assault on him and filing a false police report. Smollett's defense team reached a deal with prosecutors on March 26, 2019, in which all charges were dropped in return for Smollett performing community service and forfeiting his $10,000 bond. On March 27, 2019, it was announced that the FBI would be investigating as to why the charges were dismissed. On February 11, 2020, Smollett was re-indicted by Special Prosecutor Dan Webb on six counts of disorderly conduct for lying to the police. A jury delivered its verdict on December 9, 2021, finding Smollett guilty on five of the six counts.

Amari Allen dreadlock cutting hoax 

In September 2019, Amari Allen, a black middle school student in Virginia, claimed that three male white classmates pinned her down on the playground and cut off "chunks" of her dreadlocks. According to Allen, the boys called her "ugly" and her hair "nappy." Her grandmother asked on national TV for the boys to be dismissed from the school. However, security camera footage did not corroborate her story and eventually Allen confessed that she had cut her hair herself.

See also
 Blood libel, a false accusation against the Jews
 False accusation of rape
 Racial bias in criminal news in the United States
 To Kill a Mockingbird, a novel and subsequent film and play centering on racially charged accusations of a crime
 Wilfred Reilly, political scientist who studies political claims, author of Hate Crime Hoax: How the Left is Selling a Fake Race War published by Regnery Press

References

Sources
 Russell-Brown, Katheryn (1998). The Color of Crime: Racial Hoaxes, White Fear, Black Protectionism, Police Harassment and Other Macroaggressions see Google Books. New York University Press. 
 Simpson, Sally S.; Agnew, Robert. (2000). Of Crime and Criminality: The Use of Theory in Everyday Life. Pine Forge Press. 
 Henry, Stuart; Lanier, Mark. (2001). What Is Crime?: Controversies Over the Nature of Crime and What to Do about It. Rowman & Littlefield. 
 See, Letha A. (Lee) (2001). Violence as Seen Through a Prism of Color. Haworth Press. 
 Markovitz, Jonathan (2004). Legacies of Lynching: Racial Violence and Memory. University of Minnesota Press. 

 
History of racism in the United States
Hoaxes in the United States
Race and law in the United States
Race in the United States
Race and crime in the United States
Race and crime
Racism
Racism in the United States